European Parliament elections were held in Greece on 12 June 1994	to elect the 25 Greek members of the European Parliament. Members were elected by party-list proportional representation, with a 3% electoral threshold.

Results
The 1994 European election was the fourth election to the European Parliament in which Greece participated. The ruling PASOK under the leadership of the aging Andreas Papandreou made gains against the opposition conservative New Democracy party.  A new party Political Spring had left New Democracy and came in third ahead of the Communist Party of Greece and the Coalition of the Left and Progress which had contested the previous election in coalition.  The parties on the left elected two MEPs each, the same result as 1989.

Notes

References

Greece
European Parliament elections in Greece
1990s in Greek politics
European